John H. Stroger Jr. (May 19, 1929January 18, 2008) was an American politician who served from 1994 until 2006 as the first African-American president of the Cook County, Illinois Board of Commissioners. Stroger was a member of the Democratic Party. He was also a member of Alpha Phi Alpha fraternity and from 1992 to 1993 served as president of the National Association of Counties. Cook County's Stroger Hospital was renamed in his honor.

Early life
John Stroger was born May 19, 1929 in Helena, Arkansas. In 1953 he graduated from Xavier University in Louisiana with a B.S. in business administration. Stroger then relocated to Chicago in 1953 and became active in the Democratic party in the South Side of Chicago. After only a year Stroger was appointed as an assistant auditor with the Municipal Court of Chicago. Stroger then served as personnel director for the Cook County Jail from 1955 to 1961. Stroger attended law school at the DePaul University College of Law and graduated in 1965. While earning a law degree he worked for the financial director of the State of Illinois. In 1968, Stroger was elected 8th Ward Committeeman. After his election to the Cook County Board of Commissioners in 1970, Stroger went on to chair every major board committee, including finance, health, building and zoning. As Commissioner, Stroger sponsored legislation aimed at assisting minority- and female-owned businesses.

Board president
Stroger completed much of what he set out to do as board president including balancing the county's $2.9 billion budget. He also instituted a Juvenile Drug Court, appointed a Commission on Women's Issues and opened a new AIDS treatment and research facility. Stroger served on the Chicago Metropolitan Healthcare Council and the board of South Shore Hospital. The new Cook County Hospital was renamed the John H. Stroger Jr. Cook County Hospital after Stroger while he was serving as County Board President. Stroger was a past president of the National Association of Counties and was appointed by former President Bill Clinton as a member of the Advisory Committee On Intergovernmental Relations.

Religion and family
John Stroger was a longtime member of St. Felicitas Catholic Church on the South Side of Chicago. He and his wife, Yonnie, were the parents of three children, two of whom survive him: son Todd and daughter Yonnie Lynn. Another son, Hans Eric, died a year after graduating from his father's alma mater, Xavier University of Louisiana. Todd Stroger succeeded John as Cook County Board President.

Conflicts as Cook County Board President
Stroger came under increased fire in the later years of his presidency for what his critics call a scandal- and patronage-ridden administration. Stroger supporters counterclaimed that he dedicated his public career to providing quality and affordable health care for the poorer residents of Cook County.

Campaigns for Cook County Board President
In the 1994 Democratic primary election, Stroger defeated two opponents for county board president, which had been made on open office when incumbent President Richard Phelan unsuccessfully sought the Democratic nomination for governor. Stroger trounced Republican Aurelia Pucinski in the general election, beating her even in many white ethnic wards, to the surprise of many "machine" watchers. In the 1998 Democratic primary, he defeated a suburban challenger, Cook County Commissioner Calvin Sutker. In 2002, Stroger had no Democratic primary challenger and went on to rout Republican challenger Christopher Bullock by a margin of more than two to one. Stroger sought a fourth term in 2006 and was challenged in the Democratic primary by Cook County Commissioner Forrest Claypool, who ran as a reform candidate and accused Stroger of presiding over a "bloated" government.

2006 election
The 2006 election was among the most controversial in the colorful history of Cook County politics. Despite suffering a severe stroke just a week before the primary election and falling into brain death, John Stroger still managed to secure his party's support by a final margin of 53 percent to 47 percent over Claypool. The severity of Stroger's condition was concealed from voters both before the primary election and for three months thereafter, possibly allowing his primary victory and preventing independent opposition to the replacement Democratic candidate in the general election.  Although he had overcome health complications in the past, questions still lingered regarding his ability to serve another term as Cook County Board President.

In late June 2006 John Stroger was removed from the Democratic ticket for Cook County Board President and replaced by his son, Todd Stroger. Stroger also resigned as Cook County Board President effective August 1 and was replaced by interim president Bobbie L. Steele. Republicans and some Democrats saw the move as nepotism, and Claypool even told the Chicago Sun-Times that he would not vote in the November general election. Todd Stroger faced a challenge in that race from Republican Tony Peraica, a vocal critic of the John Stroger regime. Chicago Mayor Richard M. Daley blasted Claypool, his own former chief of staff, and warned that Claypool risked "destroying [his] political career" by not backing Stroger against Peraica. Todd Stroger received strong support from Mayor Daley and the Cook County Democratic Party. While Peraica did very well in suburban Cook County, Todd Stroger's strength among Chicago voters allowed him to win the election with 54 percent of the total vote.

Health problems and death
Stroger had an extensive history of medical complications. He was a diabetic, had battled prostate cancer and underwent a quadruple bypass in 2001. In March 2006 the Board President suffered a severe stroke, which caused him to suffer partial paralysis.  Other neurological complications occurred.  After the stroke John Stroger never again appeared in public.

Further information about Stroger's condition was released to the public through indirect disclosures.  In July 2006, WBBM-TV reported that he was back in the hospital after suffering seizures. Todd Stroger broke a long public silence in December 2007, telling the Sun-Times that his father had been improving until the seizures began. Now, though, "it's just a matter of making sure he's comfortable," Todd said. He also noted that once the seizures started, "He's not been better since."

John Stroger died on January 18, 2008, age 78.  He cast an absentee ballot for Barack Obama in the Illinois Democratic Presidential Primary before he died.

References

External links

1929 births
2008 deaths
African-American Catholics
African-American people in Illinois politics
American political bosses from Illinois
People from Helena, Arkansas
Presidents of the Cook County Board of Commissioners
Xavier University of Louisiana alumni
20th-century American politicians
Catholics from Arkansas
20th-century African-American politicians
21st-century African-American people